The Seth Wetmore House is a residence built in the Center-Hall Colonial style in 1746 at 1066 Washington Street, Middletown, Connecticut.
It was built of Clapboard siding, Brownstone foundation with asphalt shingle roof using a structural system of wood frame, post and beam with gable roof.  It was added to the National Register of Historic Places on September 10, 1970.

Relationship to Surroundings

This center-hall Colonial house faces east from the northwest corner of Washington Street Extension and Camp Street. From this site on the east slope of a ridge it commands a long view east. Although Washington Street Extension passes close by on the southwest, the house is obscured from view by thickly planted trees.

Significance

Judge Seth Wetmore (1700–1788) built this house in 1746. Judge Wetmore served as deputy to the General Assembly for forty-eight terms, and was Judge of the County Court at Hartford. No doubt one of the great local mansions of its day, it remains Middletown's best example of high style Georgian architecture. the interior is of exceptional sophistication in its appointments; the northeast parlor alone is justly famous for the high quality of its decoration. It displays in original condition a corner shell cupboard with sun-burst decoration; marbleized fluted pilasters at either side of the fireplace opening, and fine overmantel painting. The woodwork in this room is in its original condition and excellently preserved.

Although the builder of this house is unknown, it is evident that he was a master joiner. A house recorded in a Colonial Dames monograph (William Cooper House, destroyed 1930d) bears such marked similarities to this house that it is likely they were built by the same man.

This house remained in the Wetmore family for over two hundred years, and there are many traditions concerning the house including visits by Jonathan Edwards, Timothy Dwight IV, Aaron Burr and General Lafayette. A large hemlock on the property is said to have been planted by Judge Wetmore's daughter Lucy.

The Judge Seth Wetmore House is significant for its long association with the Wetmore family and as Middletown's finest example of Georgian Colonial architecture.

See also

National Register of Historic Places listings in Middletown, Connecticut

References

Middletown, Connecticut Historical and Architectural Resources. Volume IV, Card Number 296. Barbara Ann Cleary. October, 1978.
http://home.earthlink.net/~mheintz/wetmore1.htm

Houses on the National Register of Historic Places in Connecticut
Houses completed in 1742
Houses in Middletown, Connecticut
National Register of Historic Places in Middlesex County, Connecticut
1742 establishments in Connecticut